Ceroxylon ceriferum, also known as the Sacred wax palm is a species of Ceroxylon from Colombia and Venezuela.

References

External links
 
 

ceriferum